Filipp Yevgenyevich Yegorov (born June 8, 1978) is a Russian bobsledder who has competed since 2000. Competing in three Winter Olympics, he won the silver medal in the four-man event at Turin in 2006 with his teammates Alexandr Zubkov, Alexei Seliverstov, and Alexey Voyevoda. He was also a member of the four-man crew which won silver medals at the Bobsleigh European Championship in 2011 and 2012.

References
 
 

1978 births
Bobsledders at the 2002 Winter Olympics
Bobsledders at the 2006 Winter Olympics
Bobsledders at the 2010 Winter Olympics
Living people
Olympic bobsledders of Russia
Olympic silver medalists for Russia
Sportspeople from Oryol
Russian male bobsledders
Olympic medalists in bobsleigh
Medalists at the 2006 Winter Olympics